Busokelo is a new district in 2013 from Rungwe District within the Mbeya Region of Tanzania.

In 2016 the Tanzania National Bureau of Statistics report there were 106,187 people in the district from 96,348 in 2012.

Administrative subdivisions 
The district has 13 wards, 56 villages and 237 suburbs.

Wards 
Wards assigned to Busokelo District in 2016.

 Isange
 Itete
 Kabula
 Kambasegela
 Kandete
 Kisegese
 Luteba
 Lupata
 Lufilyo
 Lwangwa
 Mpata
 Mpombo
 Ntaba

References 

Districts of Mbeya Region